Coleoloides, or the coleolids, are a genus of Cambrian small shelly fossils with an aragonite skeleton. They were first described in 1889 by Charles Doolittle Walcott as members of the pteropods. Their affinity is unknown but they were probably produced by an organism of the annelid grade of complexity. Calcium carbonate fossils of coleolids have been found at Newfoundland clustered together, oriented vertically.

References

Cambrian animals of Europe
Paleozoic life of Newfoundland and Labrador
Paleozoic life of Nova Scotia
Paleozoic life of Quebec